Bunker Hill Township may refer to the following places in the United States:

 Bunker Hill Township, Macoupin County, Illinois
 Bunker Hill Township, Michigan